Laurentides—Labelle is a federal electoral district in Quebec, Canada, that has been represented in the House of Commons of Canada since 2004.

Geography
The district is located north of Gatineau and northwest of Montreal, in the Quebec region of Laurentides. It includes the Regional County Municipalities of Antoine-Labelle, and Les Laurentides, and the eastern part of Les Pays-d'en-Haut.

The main towns are Saint-Sauveur, Sainte-Agathe-des-Monts, Mont-Laurier, Mont-Tremblant and Val-David.

The neighbouring ridings are Argenteuil—Papineau—Mirabel, Pontiac, Saint-Maurice—Champlain, Joliette and Rivière-du-Nord.

History
The electoral district was created in 2004: 61.5 per cent of the riding came from Laurentides, 34.9 per cent from Pontiac—Gatineau—Labelle, and 3.6 per cent from Argenteuil—Papineau—Mirabel.  The borders of the riding were not changed in the 2012 electoral redistribution.

Member of Parliament

This riding has elected the following member of the House of Commons of Canada:

Election results

See also
 List of Canadian federal electoral districts
 Past Canadian electoral districts

References

Campaign expense data from Elections Canada
2011 Results from Elections Canada
Riding history from the Library of Parliament

Notes

Quebec federal electoral districts
Mont-Laurier
Sainte-Agathe-des-Monts